Coagula is a character from DC Comics' Doom Patrol series, the first transgender superhero by the publisher.

Character
Coagula is a transgender lesbian, former prostitute and programmer.  After having sex with former Doom Patrol member Rebis ("an alchemical hermaphrodite"), Coagula gained "alchemical powers […] the power to dissolve things on the one hand and coagulate them on the other hand."  She tried to join the Justice League, but "it's implied that she was rejected in part for being an out transgender lesbian activist"; she instead joined the Doom Patrol.  Coagula first appears in issue 70—"The Laughing Game"—defeating The Codpiece, a spurned man-turned-villain with a multifunctional, mechanical codpiece.  After her introduction in the next few issues, Coagula takes center stage in "The Teiresias Wars", a five-part story combining "Greek mythology with [Pollack's] twisted retelling of the Tower of Babel".

In DC Pride 2022, Coagula cameoed in the stories "Super Pride" and "Up at Bat".

Development
Coagula was created by Rachel Pollack.  The synergy of Coagula's name and powers are derived from the Latin phrase .  Pollack wrote Coagula's past to include prostitution and programming because those were the most-common professions for trans women in the early-to-mid 1990s.  Pollack coopted Coagula's real name (Kate Godwin) from Kate Bornstein and Chelsea Goodwin.  The Coagula character allowed Pollack to expose readers to transgender topics before being killed off, garnering positive feedback from readers who finally saw themselves represented in the pages of comics.  , Coagula was DC Comics' first and only transgender superhero, and had not yet been reused or reprinted since its original run; DC's first transgender superhero on television was Nia Nal (Nicole Maines) who premiered in Supergirl on October 14, 2018.

References

Further reading
 
 
 

comics characters introduced in 1993
DC Comics female superheroes
DC Comics LGBT superheroes
Doom Patrol
fictional characters with elemental transmutation abilities
fictional programmers
fictional prostitutes
Fictional transgender women
superheroes with alter egos